James Ricks may refer to:
 James B. Ricks, American jurist and politician
 James “Pappy” Ricks, American basketball player

See also
 Jim Ricks, American and Irish conceptual artist, writer, and curator